"Embryonic Journey" is an instrumental piece composed by Jorma Kaukonen which originally appeared as the ninth track on Jefferson Airplane's second album Surrealistic Pillow.

Other versions of "Embryonic Journey" were recorded by Kaukonen and featured on an album sharing the song's name. According to the album's liner notes, Kaukonen composed the tune in 1962 as part of a guitar workshop in Santa Clara and included it on Surrealistic Pillow at the band's behest. According to Kaukonen, the song "evolved from... messing around on a 12 string in drop D."

This song has been used in the film Purple Haze, the final Friends episode (entitled "The Last One"), in the movie The Rookie, in the movie Berkeley in the Sixties at the end with the credits, and recently in a UK television commercial for Norwich Union. It was also included on the A Walk on the Moon movie soundtrack and in Ken Burns's documentary series The Vietnam War.

Covers
Leo Kottke did a cover version on his 1979 album Balance.

References

Jefferson Airplane songs
1967 songs
Folk rock songs
Rock instrumentals
Song recordings produced by Rick Jarrard